Orosius  may refer to:
 Paulus Orosius (b. circa 375, d. 418?), a Christian historian, theologian and student of Augustine of Hippo from Gallaecia
 Bobbio Orosius, an early 7th-century manuscript of the Chronicon by Paulus Orosius
 Orosius (leafhopper), a bug genus in the family Cicadellidae

See also
 List of Roman cognomina